The Costa Rica 1864 Census was the first official census elaborated in the country by the , predecessor of current National Institute of Statistics and Census. The total population was at the moment .

Results by canton

References

Censuses in Costa Rica
1864 in Costa Rica
1864 censuses